Maksim Aleksandrovich Sklyarov (born 28 February 1998) is a Russian football player.

Club career
He made his debut in the Russian Professional Football League for FC Dynamo-2 Saint Petersburg on 27 July 2017 in a game against FC Kolomna.

He made his Russian Football National League debut for PFC Sochi on 26 August 2018 in a game against FC Armavir.

References

External links
 Profile by Russian Professional Football League

1998 births
Footballers from Saint Petersburg
Living people
Russian footballers
Russia youth international footballers
Association football midfielders
Association football defenders
PFC Sochi players
FC Dynamo Saint Petersburg players
FC Volga Ulyanovsk players